Sherrin Varghese is an Indian musician and television actor based in Mumbai. He was born on 27 June 1975 in Kerala. Sherrin has also acted in few television shows. He is known for being part of Band of Boys, formed in 2001, along with Karan Oberoi, Sudhanshu Pandey, Siddharth Haldipur and Chaitnya Bhosale. He does live vocal electronica gutted with organic instrumentation on digital low ends.

He has had three leads on prime-time soap operas, several ad films as a model, couple of films in the south and in Bollywood, theatre productions and several cameos on TV. Recently he finished Season 1 of 20 livestream concert episodes from his studio called "The Circuit" which he hosts and produces.

The Circuit (2019–ongoing) 
The Circuit is a live stream concert hosted by singer, composer and actor Sherrin Varghese in Andheri meant for audio and video productions, recordings, real time virtual production, live streaming, broadcasts, online concerts, podcasts, and gigs for artists, musicians, singers & live bands.

In a recent Mid-Day interview, Ankur Tewari stated on how the COVID-19 pandemic has crippled the music industry and how impressed he was with Sherrin Varghese on the Circuit initiative which breath new life for artistes in their moment of need.

Season 1

The seasons first episode was aired on 25 June 2019 and the last on 3 October 2019. A variety of artists participated including Anurag Sawangikar, Keshav Iyengar, Bhushan Chitnis, Sidd Coutto, Shubhangi Koshi, Bhargavi Pillai and many more.

Albums
The Rubber Band
A Band of Boys
Bollytronica
Indi-Pop
Play for the Game 2011

Television
Kohi Apna Sa as Tushar Gill
Pyar Ki Kashti Mein
Pavitra Bhagya as Shamsher Khurana: Vardhan and Reyansh's father, Baljeet's son.(2020).

Filmography

References

External links

Sherrin Varghese on Instagram
Sherrin Varghese on YouTube

Indian male singers
People from Irinjalakuda
Year of birth missing (living people)
Living people